OCFP may refer to:

 Olympiacos CFP in Piraeus, Greece
 Ontario College of Family Physicians
 Oregon-Canadian Forest Products